Coșeiu is a commune located in Sălaj County, Crișana, Romania. It is composed of three villages: Archid (Szilágyerked), Chilioara (Szilágykirva) and Coșeiu.

Population 
At the 2002 census, 50.4% of inhabitants were Hungarians, 47.5% Romanians and 2.1% Roma. 48.6% were Romanian Orthodox, 33.3% Reformed and 16.6% Baptist.

History 
Coșeiu is located about 18 km from the county seat Zalău. The earliest document to mention it dates to 1345, where it is called Kusal. In 1432 Kwsal, 1450 Kwssal, 1505 Kwssaly, 1549 Kwsaly, 1591 Kusalj, Kussally, Kusaj and in 1805 it was written as Coseiu.

Kusaly was the ancient estate of the Jakcsi family, the name is taken from here. The kusalyi Jakcs have risen fast, having held high offices in the coming centuries. Among the Jakcs descendants - whom the family name came from - George became the main royal treasurer in 1400, another of his children, Michael, between 1414 and 1428 Michael, later in 1437 he was the Voivode of Transylvania, then the espouse of Szekelyz. In 1444 Michael Jackh was also a Transylvanian voivode.

The family acquired estates in several counties, and held high offices in: Salaj, Satu Mare County, Szabolcs and Bereg counties as well. For example, in 1430 the Lord Lieutenant of the county Satu Mare was Laszlo Jakcs. In 1526, Michael Kusalyi Jackh attended the national assembly of Rakosi ambassador as the Diet of Bereg County.

The family name appears in documents in 1345 for the first time, and in the 1700–1800 years on the hilltops of the settlements traces of their castle can be seen.

In 1635 II. György Rákóczi Kusalyban donated a portion an estate to Stephan Serédi Krasna county lord lieutenant, the estate and the mansion soon became the property of the disloyal Szénási Mihaly, the captain of the field army.

In 1701 April 19, I Leopold King donated the kusalyi estate to baron Peter Serédi.

In 1910, 811, the majority of the inhabitants were Romanian, with a significant Hungarian minority.

In 1992, along with its neighboring villages, out of 1409 inhabitants 721 were Romanian, 672 Hungarian and 16 were Gypsy.

Natives
Alimpiu Barboloviciu

Sights
 Reformed Church in Coșeiu, built in the 15th century historic monument

References

Communes in Sălaj County
Localities in Crișana